"Ruby" is the 1952 theme song for the film Ruby Gentry starring Jennifer Jones, written by Mitchell Parish and Heinz Roemheld. 
There were six chartered versions of the song in 1953. The theme enjoyed much popularity in orchestral recordings by Les Baxter, with harmonica solo by Danny Welton., Victor Young And His Singing Strings with George Fields on harmonica (Columbia DO-70040, Australia), Richard Hayman And His Orchestra with Richard Hayman on harmonica, and Jerry Murad and the Harmonicats.

Notable recordings
It has subsequently become a jazz and pop standard, both as an instrumental and with lyrics by Mitchell Parish:
Richard Hayman and His Orchestra. This reached No. 3 in the Billboard charts in 1953.
Les Baxter and His Orchestra (harmonica solo by Danny Welton) had a hit with the song in 1953, peaking in the No. 7 position.
Harry James and his Orchestra. A No. 20 hit in 1953.
Victor Young and His Singing Strings. Reached number 20 in the charts in 1953.
Vaughn Monroe and His Orchestra, reaching number 27 in the charts in 1953.
Les Brown and His Band of Renown - briefly charted in 1953 at number 29. 
Ray Charles - reached No. 28 in the Billboard charts in 1960.
Adam Wade accompanied by George Paxton & His Orchestra with The Bel-Aire Singers. This directly competed against the Ray Charles version and reached No. 58 in the charts in 1960. Wade's B-side was "Too Far" written by Pat Lambert and Bob Haymes.

References

Film theme songs
1952 songs
1960 singles
Songs written for films
Songs with lyrics by Mitchell Parish